Derek Drymon (born November 19, 1968) is an American animator, writer, storyboard artist, director, comedian, and producer. He has worked on numerous animated cartoon productions of the 1990s and 2000s, best known for his work on Rocko's Modern Life, SpongeBob SquarePants and Adventure Time.

Early life 
Derek Drymon was born in New Jersey. He attended Jefferson Township and Dover public schools as a child and enjoyed drawing and making comic books. Drymon graduated from Jefferson Township High School in 1987. Drymon attended the School of Visual Arts (SVA) in New York, where he majored in Illustration, sharpening his drawing skills and moving from still images to animation. He graduated from SVA in 1992.

Career 
Drymon obtained an internship with Disney on the strength of his life drawings.

Drymon was discovered by Nickelodeon in 1993. He moved to California to work as an animator for Nickelodeon. In 1993, Drymon also began working as a storyboard artist and writer for Rocko's Modern Life. It was here he met two of his future employers, Tim Hill and Stephen Hillenburg; Hill was a writer, Hillenburg a co-producer and storyboard artist. In 1997, Hillenburg created SpongeBob SquarePants. Drymon performed many duties on SpongeBob, including being a writer on all episodes, the creative director, and, on his last season with the show, supervising producer. Drymon also worked on the Cartoon Network animated series Camp Lazlo. Drymon worked on Tim Hill's side project, the popular KaBlam! skit Action League Now!, as a storyboard artist. He also wrote the Emmy Award-nominated episode of CatDog "Doggone".

Drymon met Stephen Hillenburg on the Nickelodeon cartoon Rocko's Modern Life. Hillenburg recalled Drymon as "one of the main people in the genesis of SpongeBob". Drymon teamed up with Hillenburg, Hill, and Nick Jennings who was also a companion from Nickelodeon. Drymon was the creative director for the first three seasons and became Supervising Producer in season 3 until being replaced by Paul Tibbitt starting in season 4. Along with Stephen Hillenburg, Drymon approved the writers' ideas and outlines for episodes and controlled the creative and production process on SpongeBob.

Drymon was eventually promoted to Executive producer on television show Adventure Time, and become a lead writer for DreamWorks Pictures, and a director at Illumination Entertainment. During the first three seasons of SpongeBob, Drymon being creative director allowed him to work with executive story editor Merriwether Williams and the rest of the writing team.

Staff writer Kent Osborne responded to the writing process with Drymon and other writers by saying  "By the third season we had done 26 half-hours. I came up with millions of ideas". Despite the issues with writing new episodes, Drymon collaborated with the writers to create episode ideas like the half-hour specials and episodes that focused on other characters, for example the season three episodes "The Algae Always Greener" and "Plankton's Army" focused on Sheldon Plankton and "Doing Time" focused on Mrs. Puff. Drymon said in an interview "Coming up with episode ideas was always tough". The writers were influenced for the episode "The Secret Box", which was influenced by Drymon because he told them when he was younger he kept a "secret box", the writers thought it was hilarious and weird and used Drymon's idea to create the story of the episode.  Drymon co-wrote the pilot episode "Help Wanted". Drymon earned two Emmy nominations and along with the crew of SpongeBob won the "Best Animated Television Production" Annie award in 2005 for season 3 of SpongeBob.

Drymon hired a large amount of the staff writers, including Sam Henderson, a friend and fellow alumnus of SVA, along with Kent Osborne and Walt Dohrn.

From 2008 to 2017, Drymon work as a Storyboard Artist for DreamWorks Animation, working on films such as the Kung Fu Panda trilogy, Monsters vs. Aliens, Shrek Forever After, Puss in Boots, Turbo, Penguins of Madagascar, and Captain Underpants: The First Epic Movie.

Drymon was an executive producer (with Fred Seibert) on the Cartoon Network series Adventure Time, created by Pendleton Ward for the show's first season. He was no longer credited on episodes starting with the second season.

On September 17, 2020, Drymon was set to co-direct Hotel Transylvania: Transformania with story artist Jennifer Kluska.

Filmography

Television

Film

Bibliography

References

External links 
 

1968 births
Living people
American cartoonists
People from Jefferson Township, New Jersey
People from Morristown, New Jersey
Animators from New Jersey
American storyboard artists
American television writers
American male screenwriters
American animated film directors
American animated film producers
American male television writers
American male comedians
21st-century American comedians
Screenwriters from New Jersey
Nickelodeon Animation Studio people
Cartoon Network Studios people
DreamWorks Animation people
School of Visual Arts alumni